What would have been the third USS Hatteras (AVP-42) was a proposed United States Navy seaplane tender that was never laid down.

Construction and commissioning 
Hatteras was to have been one of 41 Barnegat-class small seaplane tenders the U.S. Navy planned to commission during the early 1940s, and was to have been built at Houghton, Washington, by the Lake Washington Shipyard. However, by the spring of 1943 the Navy deemed that number of seaplane tenders excess to requirements, and decided to complete four of them as motor torpedo boat tenders and one as a catapult training ship.  In addition, the Navy also decided to cancel six of the Barnegat-class ships prior to their construction, freeing up the diesel engines that would have powered them for use in escort vessels and amphibious landing craft.

Hatteras became one of the first four ships to be cancelled when the Navy cancelled its contract with Lake Washington Shipyard for her construction on 22 April 1943.

References 
 
 NavSource Online: Service Ship Photo Archive Small Seaplane Tender (AVP) Index

 

Cancelled ships of the United States Navy
World War II auxiliary ships of the United States
Barnegat-class seaplane tenders
Ships built at Lake Washington Shipyard